Fudbalski klub Cement Beočin is a football club based in Beočin, Serbia.

History

FK Cement Beočin was founded in 1913 by the employees of a Beočin cement company and Mr Martin Bajer, a native of Beočin who received his formal education in Budapest where he first got the idea of founding a football club.

The first starting line-up of the team in 1913 was:
Goalkeeper: Dejan Đurić
Defenders: Martin Bajer and Dragutin Karasik
Right Midfielder: M. Daraboš
Centre Midfielder: Vladislav Eseš
Left Midfielder: J. Daraboš
Right Winger: Brana Jovičić
Left Winger: Aleksandar Jegdić
Right Forward: Dejan Krkljus
Centre Forward: Herbst
Left Forward: Tipman

This starting line-up was featured until 1919 under the club name BAK. From 1919 to 1932 the team was known as BSK.

From 1922 to 1927 there were two football clubs in Beočin, the other one being FK Radnički. Radnički was dissolved in 1927 due to financial difficulties and the exodus of some players to the BSK. At that time, BSK featured the following players: 
Martin Bajer, Janika Sabo, Rudolf Kovačić, Oto Košćal, Josip Bajer, Franja Babi, Karlo Kapošvarc, Franja Mesinger, Janika Oltvanji, Nikola Dvoržak, Ladislav Eseš, D. Manjoki, Martin Dvoržak among others.

Since 1933 the club has been known as FK Cement. Up until World War II, the club included players such as Mile Stojkov, Franja Buršl, Franja Ferić, Rudika Nozak, Leopold Popović, Vilim Rakšanji, Florika Major, Stevan Vajs, Janika Košćal, Ivan Gabrić, Žaki, Ivica Horvat and others.

In 1970, during its 50-year anniversary celebrations, the club was honoured by the Football Association of Yugoslavia as one of the oldest in the country.

Current squad
As of 9 March 2019

Technical staff

Club records
Club records are in the time span from 2005 to 2018.

Biggest victories in the domestic championships

Seasons

HonoursHonours are in the time span from 1994. to 2020.National Leagues
Serbian League Vojvodina
Winners (1): 1998–99
Vojvodina League West
Winners (1): 1994–95
Runners-up (2): 2009–10, 2013–14

National Cups
Cup FSG Novi Sad
Runners-up (2): 2017–18, 2019–20

Notable players

  Nemanja Radoja
  Marko Poletanović
  Nemanja Čović
  Marko Ilić
  Marko Klisura
  Aleksandar Rakić
  Branko Žigić
  Zoltan Sabo
  Zoran GovedaricaFor the list of all current and former players with Wikipedia article, please see: :Category:FK Cement Beočin players.Coaching history

  Mirko Babić (11 July 2014 – 16 August 2017)
  Dragan Milošević (18 August 2017 – 12 April 2018)
  Radovan Krivokapić (14 April 2018 – 10 September 2018)
  Miodrag Pantelić (26 September 2018 – 17 October 2018)
  Dragan Milošević (18 October 2018 – 1 December 2018)
  Nenad Cerović (2 February 2019 – )

Notes
1. Back in 1994, the fourth tier was called First League of Vojvodina''.

References

External links
 Club profile at SrbijaSport 
 Club profile at fudbal91 
 Club profile at spox 
 Club profile at footballdatabase 
 Club profile at thefinalball 
 Club profile at soccerway 
 National team players listed by seasons at national-football-teams 
 Centenary of football in Beočin at Partizan.rs 
 Experience of a neutral visitor on Cement match at groundhoppingsrb 

 
Association football clubs established in 1913
1913 establishments in Serbia
Works association football clubs in Serbia